Binke Diabaté (born 20 December 1995) is a Malian footballer who plays for Spanish club CA Cirbonero as a forward.

Club career
Born in Mali, Diabaté moved to Spain at early age and joined CA Cirbonero's youth setup. In July 2007 he moved to Athletic Bilbao before leaving in 2012, and signing for UDC Txantrea.

Diabaté made his senior debut on 5 May 2013, scoring four goals in a 4–0 Tercera División away win against CD Lagun Artea, but was only promoted to the main squad ahead of the 2014–15 campaign. On 22 June 2015 he returned to Cirbonero, now assigned to the first team also in the fourth level.

In 2016 Diabaté joined CD Numancia, being initially assigned to the reserves still in the fourth division. On 9 April of the following year he made his first team debut, coming on as a second-half substitute for Marc Mateu in a 0–2 home loss against Girona FC in the Segunda División championship.

References

External links

Periódico La Tercera profile 

1995 births
Living people
Malian footballers
Association football forwards
Segunda División players
Tercera División players
Tercera Federación players
CD Numancia B players
CD Numancia players
CD Calahorra players
SD Logroñés players
Malian expatriate footballers
Malian expatriate sportspeople in Spain
Expatriate footballers in Spain
21st-century Malian people